Janetta Susan Gillespie (1876–1956) was a Scottish artist. Her still-life paintings were exhibited in Scotland and at the Walker gallery in Liverpool.

Biography
Gillespie was born in Bonnybridge in Stirlingshire into a family of artists. Both her brother, Alexander Gillespie and her younger sister Floris were also artists and the three would sometimes exhibit together.

Gillespie attended the Glasgow School of Art in 1913 and then again from 1915 to 1917. She taught for a time at Bonnybridge School and lived in the town throughout her life. She mostly painted flowers and still life pieces in an often bold and dashing style with a highly accomplished use of chiaroscuro. A still life, Moon Pennies, received good reviews when shown at the Royal Scottish Watercolour Society in 1952. Gillespie exhibited with, and joined, the Glasgow Society of Women Artists, winning their Lauder Award in 1934. She also exhibited with the Royal Scottish Academy, the Royal Scottish Watercolour Society, the Glasgow Institute of the Fine Arts, at the Walker Art Gallery in Liverpool and with the Aberdeen Artists Society.

References

1876 births
1956 deaths
20th-century Scottish painters
20th-century Scottish women artists
Alumni of the Glasgow School of Art
People from Stirling (council area)
Scottish women painters
Sibling artists